Tazkirat al-Awliyā ( or , lit. "Biographies of the Saints")variant transliterations: Tazkirat al-Awliyā`, Tadhkirat al-Awliya, Tazkerat-ol-Owliya , Tezkereh-i-Evliā etc., is a hagiographic collection of ninety-six Sufi saints and their miracles (Karamat) by the twelfth–thirteenth-century Persian poet and mystic, Farīd al-Dīn ‘Aṭṭar. ‘Aṭṭar's only surviving prose work comprises 72-chapters, beginning with the life of Jafar Sadiq, the Sixth Sunni Imam, and ending with the Sufi Martyr, Mansur Al-Hallaj's.

Translations
Muslim Saints and Mystics: Episodes from the Tadhkirat Al-Auliya‘ (1990); An abridged English translation by A.J. Arberry.
Le Memorial des saints (1889); A French translation by Pavet de Courteille.

List of Biographies

Jafar Sadiq
Uwais al-Qarni
Hasan Basri
Malik Dinar
Muhammad Ibn Wasi' Al-Azdi
Habib Ajami
Abu Hazim Makki
Atabah Ibn Qolam
Rabia al-Adawiyya
Ibrahim ibn Adham
Bishr Hafi
Dhul-Nun al-Misri
Bayazid Bastami
Abdullah Ibn Mobarak
Sufyan al-Thawri
Sirri saqti
Shaqiq al-Balkhi
Abu Hanifah
Al-Shafi'i
Ahmad ibn Hanbal
Dawud Tai
Harith al-Muhasibi
Abu Soleiman Darayi
Muhammad Ibn Sammak
Muhammad Aslam Al-Tusi
Ahmad ibn Harb
Hatam Asam
Sahl al-Tustari
Maruf Karkhi
Fath Museli
Ahmad Hevari
Ahmad Khezruyah
Abutorab Nokhshabi
Yahya ibn Ma'az
Shah Shoja Kermani
Yusef Ibn Al-Huseyn
Abu Hafs Haddad
Abu Muhammad Jariri
Mansur Al-Hallaj

See also
Persian literature

References

External links
Download Tadhkirat al-Awliya from scribd (in Persian, about a half of the text from the beginning)

1210s books
Attar of Nishapur
Religious biographical dictionaries
Persian literature
Sufi literature
Mystical books